Piz Jenatsch is a mountain of the Albula Alps, located in the canton of Graubünden. It has an elevation of 3,251 metres above sea level and it is located east of Piz d'Err and Piz Calderas, between the valleys of Val d'Err and Val Bever.

The closest locality is Tinizong on the west side.

References

External links
 Piz Jenatsch on Hikr

Mountains of the Alps
Alpine three-thousanders
Mountains of Switzerland
Mountains of Graubünden
Surses